The women's 5000 meter at the 2017 KNSB Dutch Single Distance Championships took place in Heerenveen at the Thialf ice skating rink on Friday 30 December 2016. Although this tournament was held in 2016, it was part of the 2016–2017 speed skating season.

There were 12 participants.

Title holder was Carien Kleibeuker.

Result

Source:

References

Single Distance Championships
2017 Single Distance
World